Soni Razdan (born 25 October 1956) is a British actress and director who works in Hindi films. She is married to film director Mahesh Bhatt and is the mother of Bollywood actress Alia Bhatt.

Early life
Razdan was born in Small Heath Birmingham, West Midlands, England to a British-German mother, Gertrude Hoelzer and an Indian Kashmiri Pandit father, Narendra Nath Razdan and grew up in Bombay, Maharashtra, India.

Career
Razdan started her career in English theatre with John Fowles' The Collector and her Hindi stage career with Bund Darvaze, Satyadev Dubey's adaptation of Jean Paul Sartre's No Exit.

Her photos were seen by Franco Zeffirelli who wanted to cast her as Mary in his miniseries, Jesus of Nazareth. The role, however, was given to Olivia Hussey and Razdan was cast as a young grieving mother as well as appearing as an extra in other scenes. 

She appeared as Sulochana in the Doordarshan TV series Buniyaad. She also acted in Indian TV serials Saahil, Gaatha and has been a regular on Indian television. In 2002, she turned to direction with Aur Phir Ek Din on Star Plus, a take-off on One Fine Day starring Michelle Pfeiffer and George Clooney.

She has also acted in Bollywood movies. Razdan directed a film called Love Affair that was expected to be released in 2016, but did not.
She acted in Meghna Gulzar's Raazi which also starred her daughter Alia in the lead role. This was the first time when she shared the screen with Alia where she played the character of Alia's mother. Soni played the lead role in the film Yours Truly where she portrayed the character of a lonely middle-aged government employee Mithi Kumar. She also appeared as the Imaaduddin Shah's mother in the 2007 movie Dil Dosti Etc. In 2018, in the light of the MeToo movement Razdan said that once she was nearly raped by someone on a film set. Though they didn't succeed, she didn't file a complaint against this attempt to rape.

Personal life
Razdan married Indian film director Mahesh Bhatt on 20 April 1986. Bhatt did not want to divorce 
his first wife, so he and Razdan converted to Islam prior to marriage and held a very private nikaah ceremony.
Upon converting to Islam Soni chose the name Sakina as her Muslim name.

She is the mother of Shaheen Bhatt (born 28 November 1988) and actress Alia Bhatt (born 15 March 1993), step mother of Pooja Bhatt & Rahul Bhatt and the distant aunt of Emraan Hashmi.

Filmography

Films

Director

Television

1995 Saahil

References

External links

Living people
1956 births
People from Birmingham, West Midlands
British people of Indian descent
British people of Kashmiri descent
Converts to Islam
British Muslims
British people of German descent
Bhatt family
British film actresses
British television actresses
British women film directors
British actresses of Indian descent
British emigrants to India
British expatriate actresses in India
European actresses in India
Actresses of European descent in Indian films
Actresses in Hindi cinema
Hindi-language film directors
Actresses in Hindi television
20th-century British actresses
21st-century British actresses